Eckhard Gerdes (born 1959) is an American novelist and editor.

Life 

Eckhard Gerdes was born in 1959 in Atlanta, Georgia, and has lived in Switzerland, Germany, the Democratic Republic of the Congo, Katanga, the Republic of South Africa, as well as in several locations throughout the United States in Illinois, Georgia, Iowa, Alaska, and California. He has three children and five grandchildren.

He earned his MFA in Fiction Writing from the School of the Art Institute of Chicago.  He also holds an MA in English from Roosevelt University in Chicago, and a BA in English from the University of Dubuque in Iowa.

Work 

Perhaps best known for his novels, his work reflects experimental technique, sometimes ignoring time, space, or cause-and-effect, in the service of stories of individuals struggling to transcend fear and limitation.

His critical work on modern and post-modern literature has appeared in the Review of Contemporary Fiction, the American Book Review, and, recently, has included a chapter on the writing of his friend Raymond Federman in Jeffrey R. DiLeo's collection Federman's Fictions (SUNY Press, 2011).

Gerdes is also the editor of the Journal of Experimental Fiction and publisher of its associated press, JEF Books.

Books 

He is the author of
 Projections [a novella, 1986, No Press]
 Truly Fine Citizen [a novel, 1989, Highlander Press]
 Ring in a River [a novel, 1992, Depth Charge Press]
 Cistern Tawdry [a novel, 2002, Fugue State Press]
 Przewalski's Horse [a novel, 2006, Red Hen Press]
 The Million-Year Centipede, or, Liquid Structures [a novel, 2007, Raw Dog Screaming Press]
 Nin and Nan (appeared in Bizarro Starter Kit (Blue) [a novella, 2008, Bizarro Press]
 My Landlady the Lobotomist [a novel, 2008, Raw Dog Screaming Press]
 The Unwelcome Guest b/w Nin and Nan [two novellas, 2010, Enigmatic Ink]
 Hugh Moore [a novel, 2010, Civil Coping Mechanisms; 2012, Heroinum Press; 2015, Dirt Heart Pharmacy Press]
 Three Psychedelic Novellas [three novellas, 2011, Enigmatic Ink]
 The Sylvia Plath Cookbook: A Satire [a short story chapbook, 2012, Sugar Glider Press]
 ’S A Bird [a play, 2013, Black Scat Books]
 23 Skidoo! 23 Form-Fitting Poems [poems, 2013, Finishing Line Press]
 How to Read [nonfiction, 2014, Guide Dog Books]
 Blues for Youse [poems, 2015, ATTOHO Sounds]
 White Bungalows [a novel, 2015, Dirt Heart Pharmacy Press]
 Recto & Verso: A Work of Asemism and Pareidolia [w/ Dominic Ward, art, 2015, Dirt Heart Pharmacy Press]
 Three Plays [three plays, 2016, Black Scat Books]
 Marco & Iarlaith: A Novel in Flash Fictions [novel, 2018, Black Scat Books]
 The Pissers' Theatre [novel, 2021, Black Scat Books]
 The Chronicles of Michel du Jabot [novel, 2022, JEF Books]

Awards and nominations

Recipient, &NOW Award for Innovative Writing 
Nominee, Georgia Author of the Year 
Finalist, Starcherone Prize for Innovative Fiction 
Finalist, The Blatt Novel of Novels Award 
Finalist, Wonderland Book Award 
Recipient, Richard Pike Bissell Award for Creative Writing

References 

Essays on his work, and reviews of individual publications, have appeared in 
Texas Review 
American Book Review 
Rain Taxi 
Notre Dame Review 
Review of Contemporary Fiction 
Blue Print Review, and elsewhere.

External links 
 Bio from Raw Dog Screaming Press
 Bizarro Central
 Author's website
 The Journal of Experimental Fiction website
 Word Riot interview
 Penman Review interview
 E & E's Compounding Pharmacy interview

1959 births
20th-century American novelists
21st-century American novelists
American male novelists
American literary critics
Living people
Postmodern writers
Postmodernists
School of the Art Institute of Chicago alumni
Writers from Chicago
20th-century American male writers
21st-century American male writers
Novelists from Illinois
21st-century American non-fiction writers
American male non-fiction writers